Pramote Teerawiwatana (14 June 1967 – 4 October 2012) was a badminton player from Thailand.

Career 
He played in six Southeast Asian Games, won the men's doubles gold in 1999 Brunei as his best results. Teerawiwatana was two times silver medalists at the Asian Games in 1998 Bangkok and 2002 Busan. He reached a career high as World No. 2 in the men's doubles event with two different partners.

Teerawiwatana competed in four consecutives Olympic Games from 1992 to 2004 in the men's doubles event. At the 2000 Sydney, Teerawiwatana competed with Tesana Panvisvas and won the first round against Dutch pair Dennis Lens and Quinten van Dalm 15–11, 15–7. In the second round they lost to a Malaysian Choong Tan Fook and Lee Wan Wah in the rubber games 15–11, 15–17, 9–15. He again participated at the 2004 Athens with Panvisvas, where they defeated Ashley Brehaut and Travis Denney of Australia in the first round, then were defeated in the round of 16 by Choong Tan Fook and Lee Wan Wah of Malaysia.

Achievements

World Cup 
Men's doubles

Asian Games 
Men's doubles

Asian Championships 
Men's doubles

Southeast Asian Games 
Men's doubles

Mixed doubles

IBF World Grand Prix 
The World Badminton Grand Prix sanctioned by International Badminton Federation (IBF) since 1983.

Men's doubles

IBF International 
Men's doubles

References

External links 
 
 

1967 births
2012 deaths
Pramote Teerawiwatana
Pramote Teerawiwatana
Badminton players at the 1992 Summer Olympics
Badminton players at the 1996 Summer Olympics
Badminton players at the 2000 Summer Olympics
Badminton players at the 2004 Summer Olympics
Pramote Teerawiwatana
Badminton players at the 1990 Asian Games
Badminton players at the 1994 Asian Games
Badminton players at the 1998 Asian Games
Badminton players at the 2002 Asian Games
Pramote Teerawiwatana
Asian Games medalists in badminton
Medalists at the 1998 Asian Games
Medalists at the 2002 Asian Games
Competitors at the 1993 Southeast Asian Games
Competitors at the 1995 Southeast Asian Games
Competitors at the 1997 Southeast Asian Games
Competitors at the 1999 Southeast Asian Games
Competitors at the 2001 Southeast Asian Games
Competitors at the 2003 Southeast Asian Games
Pramote Teerawiwatana
Pramote Teerawiwatana
Pramote Teerawiwatana
Southeast Asian Games medalists in badminton
Badminton coaches
Deaths from cancer in Thailand
Deaths from lung cancer
World No. 1 badminton players